The Baltic University Programme (BUP) is one of the largest university cooperatives in the world with 85 member universities (as of March 2022) and other institutes of higher education in the Baltic Sea Region. It has its coordinating secretariat at Uppsala University, in Sweden. The programme strives since its foundation in 1991 to find novel ways of interaction among universities by promoting openness, internationalization and mobility. The main aim is to support building strong regional educational and research communities. The main focus of the programme is Sustainable development, Environmental protection and Democracy.

The member universities are located in countries that fully or partly lays within the Drainage basin area of the Baltic Sea, and includes the countries of Czech Republic, Estonia, Finland, Germany, Latvia, Lithuania, Poland, Slovakia, Sweden and Ukraine. In each country, a national centre provides the local contacts within the Programme, the national centres are also responsible for content and arrangement of the BUP events in a half-year rotation presidency within the Programme. Some of the annual activities that are arranged are: student conferences, PhD students trainings, university teacher's training, summer schools, research conferences and different online activities.

Much of the programme's work is centralized around the 10 themes.

 Circular economy
 Climate change
 Education for sustainable development
 Renewable energy
 Sustainable food system
 Sustainable mobility
 Sustainable societies
 Sustainable tourism
 Sustainable Water resources
 Urban-Rural development

BUP Logotype and BUP history 
During 2018 an update to the BUP logotype was made. This was done to better explain the BUP history and future aim. The logotype shows a satellite in the middle, reflecting on the innovative way of teaching and networking. In the 1990s the BUP set up satellite TV arrangements, which was very novel at the time. 

The use of satellite TV allowed for a much broader participation and student involvement. The first satellite TV broadcast was staged in October 1991. It had documentaries from many of the countries in the Baltic Sea Region and with several researcher present in the broadcast. In the following year, several such broadcasts were performed enabling discussions between universities in the network. After a few years, the broadcast were made not only from Sweden and Uppsala but from all countries around the Baltic Sea, from Visby, Åbo/Turku, and St Petersburg, to Gdansk and Berlin, and there were as well space bridges. By the late 1990s, the internet had been developed and started to replace Satellite TV. Discussion between student groups were made using this new channel for interaction instead. 

The history of involving people that were far apart from each other, is something the BUP have chosen to honour in the logotype. The satellite in the middle is a reflection of connecting and enlightening the people in the Baltic Sea Region.

Organizational structure 
The programme is governed by an international board and coordinated by the coordinating secretariat at Uppsala University, Sweden. The programme also has three associate secretariats located at Åbo Akademi University in Finland, Lodz University of Technology in Poland and Hamburg University of Applied Sciences in Germany

Footnotes

References
 Official website

Baltic states
Education in Europe